Kusumpurer Golpo is a 2014 Bangladeshi romantic drama film. The film produced and directed by Ferdous Wahid (in his big screen directorial debut). It feature himself, Palash, Jasmine and Moumita in the lead roles. And Shirin Alam, Anis Chowdhury, Kazi Raju and Badol have played supporting roles in the film.

Plot
Conflict started between two brothers of the same family over the share of property. After killing his father, the younger brother, blinded by greed for property, also planned to kill his elder brother. Then the elder brother fled with his family. One day unfortunately his only son Raja (Mohsin Polash) got lost. Raja grows up and finds his father. Then he finds out that his lover Moyna's (Jasmine) father is actually his younger uncle.

Cast
 Ferdous Wahid as Diganta Acharaya
 Mohsin Polash as Raja
 Jasmine as Moyna
 Moumita as Putul
 Kazi Raju
 Badol
 Shirin Alam
 Anis Chowdhury

Soundtrack
The film soundtrack is composed by Habib Wahid.

Release 
The film was released on February 21, 2014 in 13 theaters in Bangladesh.

References

External links
 

2014 films
Bangladeshi romantic drama films
Bengali-language Bangladeshi films
2010s Bengali-language films
Films scored by Habib Wahid
2014 romantic drama films